The 2011 Albany Panthers season was the second season as a professional indoor football franchise and their second in the Southern Indoor Football League (SIFL).

The team played their home games under head coach Lucious Davis at the James H. Gray Civic Center in Albany, Georgia.

The Panthers returned to the SIFL, which had expanded from just five teams to sixteen during the offseason, for their second season. Finishing 10-2, they clinched their second playoff berth and the #2 seed. They hosted the 9-3 Erie Explosion in the first round of the playoffs, winning 68-43 and earning their first playoff win and berth in the eastern conference championship against the Columbus Lions. They would go on to win that game as well, and coupled with a Louisiana upset over the undefeated Houston Stallions, would play in and host their first ever championship game. On July 1, 2011, they beat the Louisiana Swashbucklers 69-48, to win their first ever championship.

Schedule
Key:

Regular season

Postseason

Roster

Division Standings

 Green indicates clinched playoff berth
 Purple indicates division champion
 Grey indicates best league record
 * = Failed to make the playoffs despite winning division
 ** = Folded five games into their season.
 *** = Suspended operations prior to the season due to lack of Worker's Compensation Insurance

References

Albany Panthers
Albany Panthers
Albany Panthers